Hugo Berlanga (born August 16, 1948) is an American politician. He served as a Democratic member for the 34th district in the Texas House of Representatives from 1976 to 1997.

References

1948 births
Living people
Democratic Party members of the Texas House of Representatives
People from Robstown, Texas